Lammas Day (Anglo-Saxon hlaf-mas, "loaf-mass"), also known as Loaf Mass Day, is a Christian holiday celebrated in some English-speaking countries in the Northern Hemisphere on 1 August. The name originates from the word "loaf" in reference to bread and "Mass" in reference to the Eucharist. It is a festival in the liturgical calendar to mark the blessing of the First Fruits of harvest, with a loaf of bread being brought to the church for this purpose.

On Loaf Mass Day, it is customary to bring to a Christian church a loaf made from the new crop, which began to be harvested at Lammastide, which falls at the halfway point between the summer solstice and autumn September equinox. Christians also have church processions to bakeries, where those working therein are blessed by Christian clergy.

Lammas has coincided with the feast of St. Peter in Chains, commemorating St. Peter's miraculous deliverance from prison, but in the liturgical reform of 1969 the feast of St. Alphonsus Liguori was transferred to this day, the day of St. Alphonsus' death.

While Loaf Mass Day is traditionally a Christian holy day, Lughnasadh is celebrated by Neopagans around the same time.

History

Ann Lewin explains a key practice of the Christian feast of Lammas (Loaf Mass Day) and its importance in the Christian Calendar in relation to other feasts of the Church Year:
 
In the Church of England, the mother church of the Anglican Communion, during the celebration of Holy Communion, "The Lammas loaf, or part of it, may be used as the bread of the Eucharist, or the Lammas loaf and the eucharistic bread may be kept separate."

The loaf is blessed and in Anglo-Saxon England it might be employed afterwards in protective rituals: a book of Anglo-Saxon charms directed that the Lammas bread be broken into four parts, which were to be placed at the four corners of the barn, to protect the garnered grain.

In many parts of England, tenants were bound to present freshly harvested wheat to their landlords on or before the first day of August. In the Anglo-Saxon Chronicle, where it is referred to frequently, it is called "the feast of first fruits". The blessing of first fruits was performed annually in both the Eastern and Western churches on the 1st or the 6th of August (the latter being the feast of the Transfiguration of Christ).

In medieval times the feast was sometimes known in England and Scotland as the "Gule of August", but the meaning of "gule" is unclear.

Several antiquaries beginning with John Brady offered a back-construction to its being originally known as Lamb-mass, under the undocumented supposition that tenants of the Cathedral of York, dedicated to St. Peter ad Vincula, of which this is the feast, would have been required to bring a live lamb to the church, or, with John Skinner, "because Lambs then grew out of season." This is a folk etymology, of which OED notes that it was "subsequently felt as if from LAMB + MASS".

For many villeins, the wheat must have run low in the days before Lammas, and the new harvest began a season of plenty, of hard work and company in the fields, reaping in teams. Thus there was a spirit of celebratory play.

In the medieval agricultural year, Lammas also marked the end of the hay harvest that had begun after Midsummer. At the end of hay-making a sheep would be loosed in the meadow among the mowers, for him to keep who could catch it.

In Shakespeare's Romeo and Juliet (1.3.19) it is observed of Juliet, "Come Lammas Eve at night shall she [Juliet] be fourteen."

Another well-known cultural reference is the opening of The Battle of Otterburn: "It fell about the Lammas tide when the muir-men win their hay."

William Hone speaks in The Every-Day Book (1838) of a later festive Lammas Day sport common among Scottish farmers near Edinburgh. He says that they "build towers ... leaving a hole for a flag-pole in the centre so that they may raise their colours." When the flags over the many peat-constructed towers were raised, farmers would go to others' towers and attempt to "level them to the ground." A successful attempt would bring great praise. However, people were allowed to defend their towers, and so everyone was provided with a "tooting-horn" to alert nearby country folk of the impending attack and the battle would turn into a "brawl". According to Hone, more than four people had died at this festival and many more were injured. At the day's end, races were held, with prizes given to the townspeople.

Other uses

Neopaganism

Lughnasadh is the name used for one of the eight sabbats in the Neopagan Wheel of the Year. It is the first of the three autumn harvest festivals, the other two being the autumn equinox (also called Mabon) and Samhain. In the Northern Hemisphere it takes place around 1 August, while in the Southern Hemisphere it is celebrated around 1 February.

To the members of the Asatru faith, Lammas is known as Freyfaxi, as it refers to a festival held during Old Norse times when a horse is sacrificed as an offering to Freyr. The name comes from the Old Norse words for "Freyr's horse mane", most likely referring to the deity's steed Blóðughófi.

Scottish quarter days
Lammas Day was one of the traditional Scottish quarter days (before 1886).

Horticulture
Lammas leaves or Lammas growth refers to a second crop of leaves produced in high summer by some species of trees in temperate countries to replace those lost to insect damage. They often differ slightly in shape, texture and/or hairiness from the earlier leaves. 

Exeter in Devon is one of the few towns in England that still celebrates its Lammas Fair and has a processional custom which stretches back over 900 years, led by the Lord Mayor. During the fair a white glove on a pole decorated with garlands is raised above the Guildhall. The fair now takes place on the first Thursday in July.

A low-impact development project at Tir y Gafel, Glandwr, Pembrokeshire, Lammas Ecovillage, is a collective initiative for nine self-built homes. It was the first such project to obtain planning permission based on a predecessor of what is now the sixth national planning guidance for sustainable rural communities originally proposed by the One Planet Council.

In popular culture

The Doctor Who serial The Image of the Fendahl takes place on Lammas Eve.

In the Inspector Morse episode "Day of the Devil", Lammas Day is presented as a Satanic (un)holy day, "the Devil's day".

Katherine Kurtz's alternate World War II fantasy "history" takes its title, Lammas Night, from pagan tradition surrounding the first of August and the Divine Right of Kings.

The English football club Staines Lammas F.C. is named for a local field.

The Song "Corn Rigs" by Paul Giovanni, from the soundtrack to the 1973 film The Wicker Man, takes place "upon a Lammas Night".

See also
 Plough Sunday
 Rogation days
 Leyton Marshes
 Ould Lammas Fair

References

External links

 Lammastide - The Church of England
 Lammas Day - Full Homely Divinity
  Observations on Popular Antiquities

Christian festivals in Europe
Christian processions
August observances
Holidays in Scotland
Scottish quarter days
February observances
Summer holidays

cy:Gŵyl Galan Awst